Manasa Veene is a 1987 Indian Kannada language drama film directed by Geethapriya. The film stars Srinath, Sridhar and Saritha in the lead roles. Produced by P. Ramamurthy and written by B. N. Haridas, the film released in 1987 and was a musical hit with the critics praising the work of music composer M. Ranga Rao.

Cast
 Srinath
 Sridhar
 Saritha
 Lokanath
 N. S. Rao
 Thyagaraj Urs
 Kaminidharan
 Bellary Renuka
 Sadashiva Brahmavar

Soundtrack

References

External links 
 

1987 films
1980s Kannada-language films
Indian drama films
Films scored by M. Ranga Rao
Films directed by Geethapriya